The electoral history of Bernie Sanders includes the 2016 and 2020 Democratic Party presidential primaries and caucuses, and elections as United States Senator from Vermont, United States Representative from Vermont's at-large district (1991–2007), and Mayor of Burlington (1981–1989). Sanders contested 23 elections (not counting individual presidential state primaries), of which he won 17. He has won every election he has contested since his first election to the House of Representatives in 1990, except his presidential runs.

United States Senate elections

1972

1974

2006

2012

2018

Gubernatorial elections

1972

1976

1986

Burlington mayoral elections

1981

1983

1985

1987

United States House of Representatives elections

1988

1990

1992

1994

1996

1998

2000

2002

2004

United States presidential elections

2016

States/Territories won by Senator Sanders (23): Alaska, Colorado, Democrats Abroad, Hawaii, Idaho, Indiana, Kansas, Maine, Michigan, Minnesota, Montana, Nebraska, New Hampshire, North Dakota, Oklahoma, Oregon, Rhode Island, Utah, Vermont, Washington, Wisconsin, West Virginia, and Wyoming

States with Margins of less than 5% (10): Connecticut, Illinois, Indiana, Iowa, Kentucky, Massachusetts, Missouri, Michigan, New Mexico, and South Dakota. States underlined were won by Secretary Clinton

2020

States/Territories won by Senator Sanders (10): California, Nevada, Utah, Colorado, North Dakota, Iowa, Democrats Abroad, Vermont, New Hampshire,

References 

Sanders, Bernie
Bernie Sanders
Sanders, Bernie
Sanders, Bernie